The Escape of Traitors Act 1572 (14 Eliz. I c.2), full title An Act against such as shall conspire or practice the enlargement of any prisoner committed for high treason, was an Act of Parliament of the Parliament of England enacted during the reign of Elizabeth I.

The Act provided that it was henceforth a crime to conspire to "set at liberty" any person imprisoned on the Queen's orders for treason (or suspicion of treason) against the Queen's person. If the conspiracy to release the prisoner was made before the prisoner had been indicted, the conspirator was guilty of misprision of treason and would be imprisoned; if the prisoner was between indictment and conviction, the conspirator was guilty of felony and liable to be executed by hanging; and if the prisoner had already been convicted, the conspirator was guilty of high treason and would be hanged, drawn and quartered (if male) or burned at the stake (if female).

The Act came into force from the end of that session of Parliament (July 1572) and remained in force until the death of Elizabeth, when it expired. It was formally repealed by the Statute Law Revision Act 1863.

See also
Treason Act 1423

References
Select statutes and other constitutional documents illustrative of the reigns of Elizabeth and James I, ed. by G. W. Prothero. Oxford University Press, 1913. Fourth edition.
Chronological table of the statutes; HMSO, London. 1993.

1572 in law
1572 in England
Acts of the Parliament of England (1485–1603)
Treason in England